Spofford is a 1967 play based on the novel Reuben, Reuben by Peter DeVries. Melvyn Douglas appeared in the original Broadway run.

The play was profiled in the William Goldman book The Season: A Candid Look at Broadway.

References

External links
 

1967 plays
Plays based on novels